Moshe Asis (born October 9, 1943) is a former Israeli football midfielder, who had most major appearances in Maccabi Tel Aviv, played from 1961 to 1973 and most successful player of the Maccabi Tel Aviv's history on the 1960s. Asis started his debut for international career at the Israel national football team and made in the team 14 appearances. Then his football career he retired and began working as restaurateur in Tel Aviv.

References

External links 
 Profile of Moshe Asis on Maccabi Tel Aviv website

1943 births
Living people
Israeli footballers
Maccabi Tel Aviv F.C. players
Liga Leumit players
Israeli people of Egyptian-Jewish descent
Association football midfielders
1968 AFC Asian Cup players